Noise and Resistance is a German documentary. The film follows the European DIY punk music scene. The directors enter the centres of a vivid and vibrant, a rebellious and self-conscious scene. Be it squatters in Barcelona, anti-fascists in Moscow, Dutch trade unionists, the activists of England's Crass collective, queer trailer park inhabitants in Berlin, or Swedish girl punk bands, their music always expresses a collective self-assertion, a No! set to music whose slogan : Do it yourself! has become a strident 21st century "International".
The film was mainly self-produced by the two directors. It had its international premiere at the 
Crossing Europe film Festival in Linz, Austria.

Filming locations
The documentary was shot on various locations, including Barcelona-district Gràcia; the wagon fort Schwarzer Kanal in Berlin; as well as various other locations in Britain, Russia and Sweden.

External links

 On PunkWay.net

Documentary films about punk music and musicians
2011 documentary films
2011 films
German documentary films
2010s German films